Kilen Lake is a lake in Jutland.

See also
List of lakes in Denmark

References

Lakes of Jutland